Thumb Correctional Facility (TCF) is a Michigan prison, located in Lapeer, for male prisoners. It is a Level II, lower-level security prison.

Facility
The prison was opened in 1987, and has six housing units currently used to house approximately 1,200 male Michigan Department of Corrections prisoners. Four housing units are for approximately 700 adult inmates, and two housing units are for approximately 500 teenage inmates. It is the only prison in Michigan that houses male juvenile offenders. Onsite facilities provide for foodservice, health care, facility maintenance, storage, prison administration, and industrial laundry services. The facility employs approximately 315 people.

Security
The facility is surrounded by triple  fences with razor-ribbon wire and guard towers. Electronic detection systems and patrol vehicles are used to maintain perimeter security.

Services
The facility offers libraries, a barber shop, prison worker programs, education programs, substance-abuse treatment, group therapy, and religious services. Onsite medical and dental care is supplemented by the Duane L. Waters Hospital in Jackson, Michigan.

The worker program allows the prison's laundry facility to provide services to several organizations in the area.

See also

 List of Michigan state prisons

References

External links
 
 Michigan Department of Corrections

Prisons in Michigan
Buildings and structures in Lapeer County, Michigan
1987 establishments in Michigan